Diogo Reis is a Brazilian jiu-jitsu black belt athlete. A competitor since childhood, Reis is a European Open, Brazilian Nationals, Pan and World Champion in the juvenile and lower belt divisions. Reiss is a black belt  2022 World Jiu-Jitsu Championship medallist and a 2022 ADCC World Submission Fighting Champion.

Career
Diogo Reis was born on 20 March 20 in Manaus, Brazil. Reis competed in the first ADCC South American Trials on February 5, 2022, winning the 66kg division and earning an invite to the 2022 ADCC World Championship.

On June 25, 2022, Reis represented Team Brazil at Polaris Squads 4. He drew two matches against Nick Ronan and Nathan Orchard while Team Brazil won the overall event. Reis was then invited to compete against Estevan Martinez at Who's Number One: Ryan v Pena 3 on August 7, 2022. Reis won the match by unanimous decision.

At the 2022 ADCC World Championship on 17-18 September, Reis defeated Ashley Williams on points in the opening round and his teammate Fabricio Andrey by decision in the quarter-final on the first day. He defeated Josh Cisneros on points in the semi-final on the second day before winning the 66kg division by beating Gabriel Sousa on points in the final.

On December 11, 2022, Reis won a bronze medal at the IBJJF World Championship in the Light-Featherweight division.

Reis competed in the IBJJF Curitiba International Open on March 11 and 12, 2023, winning both the gi and no gi featherweight division.

Notes

References

Living people
People from Manaus
People awarded a black belt in Brazilian jiu-jitsu
Brazilian practitioners of Brazilian jiu-jitsu
Year of birth missing (living people)
ADCC Submission Fighting World Champions (men)